Medina High School may refer to the following secondary schools:

 Medina College in Newport, Isle of Wight, England, formerly known as Medina High School
 Medina High School (Medina, Ohio) in Medina, Ohio, USA
 Medina High School (Texas) in Medina, Texas, USA
 Medina High School (New York) in Medina, New York, USA